Malkankoppa is a village in Dharwad district of Karnataka, India.

Demographics 
As of the 2011 Census of India there were 340 households in Malkankoppa and a total population of 1,672 consisting of 856 males and 816 females. There were 224 children ages 0-6.

References

Villages in Dharwad district